Stegomyia is a large subgenus of the mosquito genus Aedes with 131 species classified in six species groups (group uncertain for one species), two groups of which are further divided into subgroups.

Bionomics and disease relations 
The immature stages of species of subgenus Stegomyia are found in natural and artificial containers. Typical habitats are tree holes, but many species inhabit small amounts of water contained in dead and fallen plant parts. A few species utilise rock holes, crab holes and the leaf axils of various plants. Eggs are normally resistant to desiccation and hatch when the habitat is filled with water. Females are typically diurnal and many species (approximately 50) are known to bite humans. They also feed on a variety of domestic and wild animals, including mammals, birds, reptiles and amphibians.

Subgenus Stegomyia is a medically important group. Ae. aegypti is the classical vector of yellow fever and dengue fever viruses and a proven vector of other viruses. Ae. albopictus is also an important vector of dengue fever virus. Other recognised vectors of yellow fever virus include Ae. africanus and Ae. luteocephalus in areas of central and western Africa and Ae. bromeliae in East Africa. Some species of the Scutellaris Group are efficient vectors of Wuchereria bancrofti in the South Pacific. Various arbo viruses have been isolated from other species of the subgenus.

Distribution 
Species of subgenus Stegomyia have distributions in the Afrotropical, Australasian and Oriental Regions. Two species, Ae. aegypti and Ae. albopictus, have been transported to areas of the Nearctic, Neotropical and Palaearctic Regions by human agency.

Species 
The subgenus Stegomyia contains 131 species
Aedes aegypti  - yellow fever mosquito,
Aedes africanus  yellow fever mosquito
Aedes agrihanensis 
Aedes albopictus  - forest day mosquito, Asian tiger mosquito, tiger mosquito
Aedes alcasidi 
Aedes alorensis 
Aedes amaltheus 
Aedes andrewsi  
Aedes angustus  
Aedes annandalei 
Aedes aobae 
Aedes apicoargenteus 
Aedes bambusae  
Aedes blacklocki 
Aedes bromeliae 
Aedes burnsi 
Aedes calceatus  
Aedes chaussieri  
Aedes chemulpoensis 
Aedes contiguus  
Aedes cooki 
Aedes corneti 
Aedes craggi 
Aedes cretinus  
Aedes daitensis 
Aedes deboeri  
Aedes demeilloni  
Aedes denderensis 
Aedes dendrophilus  
Aedes desmotes 
Aedes dybasi 
Aedes ealaensis 
Aedes edwardsi 
Aedes ethiopiensis 
Aedes flavopictus 
Aedes fraseri 
Aedes futunae 
Aedes gallois 
Aedes galloisiodes 
Aedes gandaensis 
Aedes gardnerii 
Aedes grantii 
Aedes guamensis 
Aedes gurneyi
Aedes hakanssoni 
Aedes hansfordi 
Aedes hebrideus  
Aedes heischi 
Aedes hensilli 
Aedes hogsbackensis 
Aedes hoguei 
Aedes horrescens  
Aedes josiahae 
Aedes katherinensis 
Aedes keniensis 
Aedes kenyae 
Aedes kesseli 
Aedes kivuensis  
Aedes krombeini 
Aedes langata 
Aedes ledgeri 
Aedes lilii 
Aedes luteocephalus 
Aedes maehleri Bohart, 1957
Aedes malayensis 
Aedes malikuli 
Aedes marshallensis 
Aedes mascarensis 
Aedes masseyi  
Aedes matinglyorum 
Aedes maxgermaini 
Aedes mediopunctatus 
Aedes metallicus (  
Aedes mickevichae 
Aedes mpusiensis 
Aedes muroafcete 
Aedes neoafricanus 
Aedes neogalloisi 
Aedes neopandani 
Aedes njombiensis 
Aedes novalbopictus 
Aedes opok 
Aedes palauensis 
Aedes pandani 
Aedes patriciae 
Aedes paullusi 
Aedes pernotatus 
Aedes perplexus 
Aedes pia 
Aedes polynesiensis 
Aedes poweri 
Aedes pseudoafricanus 
Aedes pseudoalbopictus 
Aedes pseudonigeria 
Aedes pseudoscutellaris 
Aedes quasiscutellaris 
Aedes rhungkiangensis 
Aedes riversi 
Aedes robinsoni 
Aedes rotanus 
Aedes rotumae 
Aedes ruwenzori 
Aedes saimedres 
Aedes saipanensis
Aedes sampi 
Aedes schwetzi   
Aedes scutellaris  
Aedes scutoscriptus 
Aedes seampi 
Aedes seatoi 
Aedes segermanae 
Aedes sibiricus 
Aedes simpsoni 
Aedes soleatus  
Aedes strelitziae 
Aedes subalbopictus 
Aedes subargenteus  
Aedes tabu 
Aedes tongae  
Aedes tulagiensis  
Aedes unilineatus 
Aedes upolensis 
Aedes usambara 
Aedes varuae 
Aedes vinsoni 
Aedes w-albus 
Aedes wadai 
Aedes woodi

References 

Aedes
Insect subgenera